W Django! (also known as A Man Called Django! ) is a 1971 Italian Spaghetti Western film directed by Edoardo Mulargia and starring Anthony Steffen.

Plot
With the help of the horse thief Carranza, Django tracks down and kills one by one the men who murdered his wife.

Cast 

Anthony Steffen as Django
Stelio Candelli as Jeff
Glauco Onorato as  Carranza
Cris Avram as  Gomez 
 Esmeralda Barros as  Lola
 Donato Castellaneta as  Paco 
 Simonetta Vitelli as  Ines
Benito Stefanelli as  Ibanez
 Riccardo Pizzuti as  Thompson 
 Furio Meniconi as The Sheriff

References

External links

Spaghetti Western films
1971 Western (genre) films
1971 films
Django films
Films directed by Edoardo Mulargia
Films scored by Piero Umiliani
1970s Italian films